Erpetogomphus is a genus of dragonfly in the family Gomphidae. They are commonly known as ringtails. Most of the species are predominantly green coloured and the males have a moderately clubbed tail. A fossil species is known from the Miocene Mexican amber

The genus contains the following species:
Erpetogomphus agkistrodon 
Erpetogomphus boa 
Erpetogomphus bothrops  – one-striped ringtail
Erpetogomphus compositus  – white-belted ringtail
Erpetogomphus constrictor  – knob-tipped ringtail
Erpetogomphus cophias 
Erpetogomphus crotalinus  – yellow-legged ringtail
Erpetogomphus designatus  – eastern ringtail
Erpetogomphus elaphe 
Erpetogomphus elaps   – straight-tipped ringtail
Erpetogomphus erici 
Erpetogomphus eutainia  – blue-faced ringtail
Erpetogomphus heterodon  – dashed ringtail
Erpetogomphus lampropeltis   – serpent ringtail
Erpetogomphus leptophis  – dark-shouldered ringtail
Erpetogomphus liopeltis 
Erpetogomphus ophibolus 
Erpetogomphus sabaleticus 
Erpetogomphus schausi 
Erpetogomphus sipedon 
Erpetogomphus tristani 
Erpetogomphus viperinus

References

Gomphidae
Anisoptera genera
Taxa named by Edmond de Sélys Longchamps
Taxonomy articles created by Polbot